The Carrie Nation House in Medicine Lodge, Kansas, also known as Carry A. Nation Home and Museum, was a home of temperance movement leader Carrie A. Nation.  It is one of two houses listed as Carry A. Nation House on the U.S. National Register of Historic Places; the other is the Carry A. Nation House in Lancaster, Garrard County, Kentucky.

History
Carrie Nation lived in this small brick house, at 211 W. Fowler Ave. (US 160), at the corner with Oak Street, in Medicine Lodge, from 1889 to 1902. In 1899 she received a "heavenly vision" to go to the nearby town of Kiowa, where she wrecked three saloons as part of her crusade against consumption of alcoholic beverages.

Subsequently, in 1902, she sold the house and used the sale proceeds to open a home in Kansas City for the wives of drunkards.

The building was bought by the Women's Christian Temperance Union in the 1950s. It was declared a National Historic Landmark in 1976.

The house is located next to a reproduction of an 1874 stockade that was used to protect settlers against attack from Native Americans. The actual stockade was much larger and located to the northeast, near the center of town.  The reproduction was built as a commercial venture in 1961, but closed due to financial problems in 1982.  Since then it has reopened as the Medicine Lodge Stockade Museum.

Tickets to the stockade museum also include entrance to the Carrie Nation House.

The 1975 NRHP nomination states "The house suffers though, from proximity to the Medicine Lodge Stockade Museum, a touristy replica of a fort."

References

External links

 Medicine Lodge Stockade Museum: Exhibits

Biographical museums in Kansas
Historic house museums in Kansas
Houses completed in 1889
Houses on the National Register of Historic Places in Kansas
Museums in Barber County, Kansas
National Historic Landmarks in Kansas
Women's museums in the United States
Houses in Barber County, Kansas
National Register of Historic Places in Barber County, Kansas
House (Kansas)